Kim Dotson is a former national level competitor in taekwondo from Cleveland, Ohio, United States.  Kim would win the 1985 World Cup. Kim would win gold at the 1986 PanAmerican Championships.  Kim would compete in the 1988 Seoul Olympic Games.  and would win Silver at both the 1987 and 1989 World Taekwondo Championships. Kim would serve as a coach for several women in taekwondo.

References

Year of birth missing (living people)
Living people
American female taekwondo practitioners
Olympic taekwondo practitioners of the United States
Taekwondo practitioners at the 1988 Summer Olympics
World Taekwondo Championships medalists
20th-century American women